The South American Youth Championship 1971 was held in Asunción, Paraguay.

Teams
The following teams entered the tournament:

 
 
 
  
 
  (host)

Group stage

Group A

Group B

Semifinals

Final

External links
Results by RSSSF

South American Youth Championship
1971 in youth association football
Sports competitions in Asunción
March 1971 sports events in South America
1970s in Asunción